John Henderson (born 31 August 1938) is a former Australian rules footballer who played for Collingwood in the VFL.

Henderson played mostly as a centreman but was originally a half back. He was a premiership player with Collingwood in 1958 and a Victorian interstate representative. Although he never won a best and fairest he was Collingwood's top vote getter in the 1963 Brownlow Medal count, finishing 4th in the league. 

He was appointed captain of Collingwood for the 1965 season.

After playing in the 1966 VFL Grand Final, which they lost to St Kilda by a point, Henderson left Collingwood and joined Yarraville in the VFA as coach. In 1972, Henderson coached local team Donvale United to a premiership in the ESCFA.

References

External links

1938 births
Australian rules footballers from Victoria (Australia)
Collingwood Football Club players
Collingwood Football Club Premiership players
Yarraville Football Club coaches
Living people
One-time VFL/AFL Premiership players